The Food Processing HR Council (FPHRC) is one of 40 sector councils that is funded by the Government of Canada and HRSDC. It was founded in 2009, the FPHRC is a non-profit industry driven organization that focuses on current human resources issues.

FPHRC Provides: Communication; Market Knowledge; Skills Development and Training; National Occupational Standards; Attraction and Retention of Workers.

Board of directors
 CHAIR - Gay Hahn, Avalon Dairy, BC Food Processors
VICE CHAIR - Mike Timani, Fancy Pokket
TREASURER - John Swan, Owner, Knol Farms Ltd
Mark Pickard, InfraReady Products
Phil Leblanc, IMO Foods
Donna Pomeroy, Country Ribbon Inc.
Sherri Deveau, Ganong Bros
Dave Pashley, Marine Harvest Canada
Nick Johnson, Quality Meat Packers Ltd
Jerry Peltier, Congress of Aboriginal Peoples
Lise Perron, Comité sectoriel de main-d’oeuvre en transformation alimentaire
Dave Lippert, Dare Foods
Johanna Oehling, Executive Director, FPHRC

References

External links
Canadian Sector Councils 
HRSDC Sector Councils 
Ottawa Focus 

Trade associations based in Canada
Food processing